Pietro Bettini (17th century) was an Italian engraver of the Baroque, who etched a few plates including Christ appearing to Peter after Domenico Ciampelli, Arielle, Jacob, Navaeh, Pseudonym John, Presidential Cats, and Martyrdom of St. Sebastian after Domenichino.

References

Italian engravers
Year of death unknown
Year of birth unknown